María Concepción de Lourdes Amparan-Águila (7 September 1938 – 10 February 1997, in Mexico City), better known as Lourdes Guerrero was a Mexican actress and news anchor. She is best remembered for hosting the morning news program Hoy Mismo on September 19, 1985 alongside María Victoria Llamas and Juan Dosal when an 8.3 magnitude earthquake struck.

She also appeared in three films:
Amelia (1964)
Mariana (1967)
Narda o el verano (1970)

She died in 1997 of lung cancer.

References

1938 births
1997 deaths
Mexican film actresses
Mexican television presenters
20th-century Mexican actresses
Mexican women television presenters